Brazil Can Do More, renamed Change Brazil as of 2014, was a centrist electoral coalition in Brazil formed around the centrist Brazilian Social Democracy Party (PSDB) for the 2010 presidential election. It was formed by six parties: PSDB, Democrats (DEM), Brazilian Labour Party (PTB), Popular Socialist Party (PPS), Party of National Mobilization (PMN) and Labour Party of Brazil (PTdoB). Its presidential candidate was former São Paulo Governor José Serra from PSDB and the vice-presidential candidate was Rio de Janeiro federal deputy Indio da Costa from DEM.

On October 3, Serra was the second most-voted candidate at the presidential election. Because the most voted candidate, Dilma Rousseff, was not able to get 50%+1 of the unspoilt votes, she faced Serra in a run-off on October 31, which Rousseff won.

At the legislative election, the Brazil Can Do More coalition gained 136 out of 513 seats in the Chamber of Deputies, as well as 25 out of 81 seats in the Federal Senate. This result was an all-time low for the lulist opposition. On the other hand, the center-left For Brazil to Keep on Changing coalition, which gathered around Lula's chosen successor Dilma Rousseff, reached an all-time high.

For the 2014 elections, the alliance changed its name to Change Brazil and was led by Aécio Neves. The coalition once again lost the election.

In 2017, Aécio Neves was forced to step down from the coalition leadership after he got involved in a series of corruption scandals including Operation Car Wash.

The coalition was dissolved in 2018, with its parties supporting different candidates in the 2018 general election.

Composition

Electoral results

Presidential elections

Legislative elections

References

2010 elections in Brazil
2010 establishments in Brazil
2018 disestablishments in Brazil
Defunct political party alliances in Brazil
Political parties disestablished in 2018
Political parties established in 2010